The 1937 Tour de France was the 31st edition of the Tour de France, one of cycling's Grand Tours. The Tour began in Paris with a flat stage on 30 June, and Stage 12b occurred on 14 July with a flat stage to Montpellier. The race finished in Paris on 25 July.

Stage 1
30 June 1937 – Paris to Lille,

Stage 2
1 July 1937 – Lille to Charleville,

Stage 3
2 July 1937 – Charleville to Metz,

Stage 4
3 July 1937 – Metz to Belfort,

Stage 5a
4 July 1937 – Belfort to Lons-le-Saunier,

Stage 5b
4 July 1937 – Lons-le-Saunier to Champagnole,  (TTT)

Stage 5c
4 July 1937 – Champagnole to Geneva,

Rest day 1
5 July 1937 – Geneva

Stage 6
6 July 1937 – Geneva to Aix-les-Bains,

Stage 7
7 July 1937 – Aix-les-Bains to Grenoble,

Stage 8
8 July 1937 – Grenoble to Briançon,

Stage 9
9 July 1937 – Briançon to Digne,

Rest day 2
17 July 1937 – Digne

Stage 10
11 July 1937 – Digne to Nice,

Rest day 3
12 July 1937 – Nice

Stage 11a
13 July 1937 – Nice to Toulon,

Stage 11b
13 July 1937 – Toulon to Marseille,  (TTT)

Stage 12a
14 July 1937 – Marseille to Nîmes,

Stage 12b
14 July 1937 – Nîmes to Montpellier,

References

1937 Tour de France
Tour de France stages